Salvation Army is a 2013 French-Swiss-Moroccan drama film written and directed by Abdellah Taia in his directorial debut. It is an adaptation of Taia's 2006 autobiographical novel of the same name. Taia submitted the controversial film's original screenplay to the National Centre for Moroccan Cinema, hoping it would be released in Morocco. The film won multiple awards and was screened at the Venice Film Festival.

Synopsis 
The film follows a young Moroccan homosexual man in a society that denies his sexuality.

Cast 

 Saïd Mrini (young Abdellah)
 Karim Ait M'Hand (adult Abdellah)
 Amine Ennaji (Slimane)
 Frédéric Landenberg (Jean)
 Hamza Slaoui (Mustapha)
 Malika El Hamaoui (Abdellah's mother)
 Abdellah Swilah (Abdellah's father)
Youness Chara (smoker)
Oumaima Miftah (sister #1)
Souhaila Achike (sister #2)
Houda Mokad (sister #3)
Ibtissam Es Shaimi (sister #4)
Hasna Boulahama (sister #5)

Awards and accolades 

 Grand Jury Prize: French Feature Film (Angers Film Festival)
 Special Programming Award for Artistic Achievement (Outfest Film Festival)
 Best First Feature Film (Durban International Film Festival)

References

External links 
 
Film's press kit

Moroccan drama films
French drama films
French LGBT-related films
Swiss LGBT-related films
2013 LGBT-related films
2013 drama films
2013 directorial debut films
2010s French films